Tisgaon Dam, is an earthfill dam on Parashri river near Dindori, Nashik district in the state of Maharashtra in India.

Specifications

Purpose
 Irrigation

See also
 Dams in Maharashtra
 List of reservoirs and dams in India
 Bhalerao 701

References

Dams in Nashik district
Dams completed in 1995
1995 establishments in Maharashtra